Shin Sang-hoon (born 1 August 1993) is a South Korean ice hockey player currently playing for the Atlanta Gladiators of the ECHL.

He competed in the 2018 Winter Olympics for the South Korea men's national ice hockey team.

Playing career
Shin became the first Korean-born player to record points in an ECHL game on his debut for the Atlanta Gladiators on 6 February 2022.

References

External links

1993 births
Living people
Ice hockey people from Seoul
HL Anyang players
Atlanta Gladiators players
Ice hockey players at the 2018 Winter Olympics
Kiekko-Vantaa players
South Korean ice hockey forwards
Olympic ice hockey players of South Korea
Asian Games silver medalists for South Korea
Medalists at the 2017 Asian Winter Games
Asian Games medalists in ice hockey
Ice hockey players at the 2017 Asian Winter Games
South Korean expatriate sportspeople in the United States
Expatriate ice hockey players in the United States